The Fall of the House of Usher is a 1988 opera by Philip Glass to a libretto based on Edgar Allan Poe's 1839 short story by Arthur Yorinks who also worked with Glass on The Juniper Tree.

Since its 1988 staging in Cambridge, Glass’s opera has been mounted by numerous opera companies, including Long Beach Opera (California), Wolf Trap Opera (Virginia), Cottbus (Germany), and the renowned Maggio Musicale Festival in Florence (Italy).

The Fall of the House of Usher was staged in Firenze, Italy during the "Maggio Musicale Fiorentino" Festival in May 1992, conducted by Marcello Panni and staged by Richard Foreman in presence of the author in Teatro della Pergola, Firenze.

References
 

Operas
1988 operas
Operas by Philip Glass
English-language operas
Operas based on The Fall of the House of Usher